Gold. is the debut full-length album from Atlanta-based noise rock/sludge metal band Whores. The album was released on October 28, 2016 by the record label eOne. The album was named the #10 best metal album of 2016 by Rolling Stone and as the best metal album of 2016 by Kelsey Chapstick of MetalSucks.

Track listing

Personnel
Whores
Christian Lembach - guitar, vocals
Casey Maxwell - bass
Donnie Adkinson - drums

Production
Ryan Boesch - production, recording, mastering
Christian Lembach - production
John Horeseco - mastering
Patrick Copeland - artwork

References 

2016 debut albums
Whores (band) albums
E1 Music albums